Adra Prison is a prison in Syria, on the northeast outskirts of Damascus. Political prisoners are held in the prison, along with a mixture of civil prisoners such as traffic offenders, murderers, and drug dealers. In 2014, the prison held more than 7,000 inmates, a dozen of them women, in space designed for 2,500. The Washington Post referred to the prison as "infamous".

History
Ghassan Najjar, an engineer who was imprisoned in 1980, reportedly went on two hunger strikes, one to protest conditions in the prison. His fellow inmates said he was beaten so badly by prison guards trying to force him to eat that he suffered spinal injuries.

Mas'ud Hamid, a Kurdish journalism student, was held in solitary confinement in the prison for one year from 2003–04 before he was allowed monthly visits, and Human Rights Watch said that interrogators reportedly tortured him and beat him with a studded whip on the bottom of his feet.

In December 2004 Kurds in the prison conducted a hunger strike, which was allegedly halted by torture.

In March 2011, 13 prisoners at the prison, including 80-year-old former judge Haitham al-Maleh and lawyer Anwar al-Bunni began a hunger strike to protest government oppression and the holding of political prisoners.

On July 1, 2013, female detainees in the prison began hunger strike in response to negligence of their cases by the public prosecution of the Counterterrorism Court, and absence of approval of their respective trials.

As of December, 2014, the jail is well beyond its 2,500 person capacity at over 7,000 prisoners of all types of accused offenders, from murderers to traffic violators.

In August and September, 2015, Jaysh al-Islam shelled and stormed the prison, taking control of two buildings.

Current prisoners
 Anwar al-Bunni
 Mas'ud Hamid
 Haitham al-Maleh

Former prisoners
 Bassel Khartabil

See also
 Tadmor Prison

References

Prisons in Syria
Torture in Syria
Damascus
Protest tactics